Ma femme s'appelle reviens is a 1982 French comedy film directed by Patrice Leconte.

Plot 
Bernard has been brutally left by his wife, without even a file for divorce, and attempts to absolutely get her back, on the sudden departure of her flight for Lausanne, but he fails. Having committed several infractions during his trip, he is arrested by the police but is finally free a few hours later.

Firmly convinced that they were happy together, Bernard does not understand why she is gone. Trying to forget it but having a hard time overcoming his sorrow, he goes living in a residence "for bachelors". Employed by SOS Médecins, he decides to ensure the overnight care to occupy his insomnia. He is demanded one evening to rescue a neighbor, Nadine Foulon, who has gotten ill in an elevator. Nadine is also crossing a difficult period, since her partner Terry, a singer and guitarist, has completely abandoned her and is continuing to "mess" with her feelings. Working as a photographer, she is unable to forget it and swings between depression and bulimia.

Cast 
 Michel Blanc ... Bernard Fizet
 Anémone ... Nadine Foulon
 Xavier Saint-Macary ... Philippe
 Christophe Malavoy ... Terry
 Catherine Gandois ... Mireille
 Pascale Rocard ... Anne
 Michel Rivard .. Alexandre
 Sylvia Zerbib ... daughter of the real-estate agent
 Patrick Bruel ... François, Anne's friend
 Charlotte de Turckheim ... a patient
 Jean-Michel Ribes ... police officer
 Jean-Paul Lilienfeld ... thief in the bar
 Gilles Dyan ... Antoine
 Ellen Von Unwerth ... Kerstin
 Laura Gomez ... Caroline

External links 

1982 films
1982 comedy films
French comedy films
Films directed by Patrice Leconte
1980s French-language films
1980s French films